Rakić is a surname in former Yugoslavia: mainly in Serbia but also in Bosnia, Croatia, Montenegro, and Slovenia, and may refer to:

 Abby Rakic-Platt (born 1993), British actress
 Aleksandar Rakić (born 1987), Serbian footballer
 Aleksandar Rakić (born 1992), Austrian mixed martial artist of Serbian origin
 Dragana Rakić (born 1973), Serbian politician
 Dušan Rakić (1943-2020), Yugoslav and Serbian naval officer
 Đorđe Rakić (born 1985), Serbian football player
 Goran Rakić (born 1971), Kosovo Serb politician
 Ljubisav Rakić (born 1931), Serbian neurobiologist, professor and academic
 Luka Rakić (born 1991), Montenegrin sprinter
 Katarina Rakić (born 1979), Serbian politician
 Milan Rakić (1876–1938), Serbian poet
 Milan Rakič (born 1981), Slovenian footballer
 Milica Rakić (1996–1999), child victim of the NATO bombing of Yugoslavia
 Miljan Rakić (born 1986), Serbian-Hungarian basketball player
 Miodrag Rakić (1975–2014), Serbian politician
 Mirjana Rakić (born 1948), Croatian journalist
 Mita Rakić (1846-1890), Serbian writer and politician
 Paško Rakić (born 1933), Serbian neuroscientist
 Patricia Goldman-Rakic (1937-2003), American professor of neuroscience, neurology, psychiatry and psychology at Yale University School of Medicine
 Predrag Rakić, Bosnian drummer and music manager
 Tijana Rakić (born 1987), Serbian beauty queen
 Tomislav Rakić (born 1934), Serbian chess master
 Vićentije Rakić (1750-1818), Serbian writer, poet, priest, philanthropist
 Vojin Rakić (born 1967), Serbian philosopher and political scientist

Bosnian surnames
Croatian surnames
Serbian surnames